Sagar Assembly constituency is a Legislative Assembly constituency of South 24 Parganas district in the Indian State of West Bengal.

Overview
As per order of the Delimitation Commission in respect of the Delimitation of constituencies in the West Bengal, Sagar Assembly constituency is composed of the following:
 Sagar community development block
 Fraserganj, Haripur, Mousuni, Namkhana and Shibrampur gram panchayats of Namkhana community development block

Sagar Assembly constituency is a part of No. 20 Mathurapur (Lok Sabha constituency).

Members of Legislative Assembly

Election results

2021

2016

2011

1977-2006
In 2006, Milan Parua of CPI(M) won the Sagar Assembly constituency defeating his nearest rival Bankim Chandra Hazra of AITC. Bankim Chandra Hazra of AITC defeated Prabahanjan Mondal of CPI(M) in 2001. Prabhanjan Mondal of CPI(M) defeated Haripada Sen of INC in 1996, Anil Baran Maitry of INC in 1991, Byomkes Maity of INC in 1987, Haripada Sen of INC in 1982 and Govardhan Dengal of Janata Party in 1977.

1952-1972
Prabhanjan Mondal of CPI(M) won in 1972 and 1971. Govardhan Dengal of Bangla Congress won in 1969. T. Mishra of INC won in 1967. The Sagar Assembly constituency was not there in 1962 and 1957. Haripada Baguli of KMPP won in 1952.

References

Assembly constituencies of West Bengal
Politics of South 24 Parganas district